Aulacothyropsidae is a family of brachiopods belonging to the order Terebratulida.

Genera:
 Aulacothyropsis Dagys, 1959
 Babukella Dagis, 1974
 Camerothyris Bittner, 1890
 Coriothyris
 Fallax Atkins, 1960
 Hynniphoria Suess, 1859
 Katchathyris
 Ornatothyrella Dagis, 1974
 Septicollarina Zezina, 1981
 Smirnovina Calzada, 1985
 Vandobiella Pozhariskaya, 1966

References

Terebratulida